Nagytevel is a village in Veszprém county, Hungary.

External links 
 Street map (Hungarian)

Populated places in Veszprém County